Negretti is a surname. Notable people with the surname include:

 Ettore Negretti (1883–after 1902), Italian footballer
 Giovanna Negretti, American activist
 Henry Negretti (1818–1879) of the firm Negretti and Zambra
 Jacopo Negretti (1480–1528) known as Palma Vecchio, Italian painter